Bezar was a curated online design marketplace founded in 2015 by former Fab co-founder Bradford Shellhammer (CEO), Matt Baer (COO), PieterJan Mattan (Creative Director), and Justin Chen (CFO). The site featured unique pieces from both emerging designers and established brands in four categories: home, accessories, jewelry, and art. The company was headquartered in SoHo, Manhattan.

The name “Bezar” comes from a combination of the words bazaar and bizarre, which both are phonetically pronounced \bə-ˈzär\.

History
In 2013, Bradford Shellhammer left his role as co-founder and chief design officer of ecommerce website Fab, maintaining a role as a shareholder and non-executive advisor.

In early 2015, Shellhammer announced he would launch and curate his own online design marketplace. Bezar launched in March 2015, featuring four new virtual pop-up shops daily, and a range of exclusive collaborations with designers, labels and brands like FLOS  and  Refinery29.   Bezar's marketplace component, featuring hundreds of permanent designer storefronts, was rolled out in September 2015.

Funding
Before its launch, Bezar raised a total of $2.25 million in two and a half weeks from seven investment funds and 20 individuals.  Notable investors include designer Yves Béhar, Kenneth Lerer, Hiroshi Mikitani and Whoopi Goldberg.

Acquisition
In February 2016, Bezar was acquired by online luxury goods retailer AHAlife Holdings, Ltd. (ASX:AHL)

References

2015 establishments in the United States
Online marketplaces of the United States